The Mysterious Rider is a 1933 American pre-Code Western film directed by Fred Allen and written by Harvey Gates and Robert N. Lee. The film stars Kent Taylor, Lona Andre, Berton Churchill, Irving Pichel, Warren Hymer, Gail Patrick and Cora Sue Collins. The film was released on January 20, 1933, by Paramount Pictures.

Plot

Cast 
Kent Taylor as Wade Benton
Lona Andre as Dorothy
Berton Churchill as Mark King
Irving Pichel as Cliff Harkness
Warren Hymer as 'Jitney' Smith
Gail Patrick as Mary Benton Foster
Cora Sue Collins as 'Jo-Jo' Foster
E. H. Calvert as Sheriff Matt Arnold
Sherwood Bailey as Matt Arnold Jr.
Clarence Wilson as Hezekiah Gentry
Niles Welch as John Foster

References

External links 
 

1933 films
American Western (genre) films
1933 Western (genre) films
Paramount Pictures films
Films based on works by Zane Grey
American black-and-white films
Films directed by Fred Allen (film editor)
1930s English-language films
1930s American films